The 2015 Ironman 70.3 World Championship was a triathlon competition that was held in Zell am See-Kaprun, Austria on August 30, 2015. It was won by Jan Frodeno of Germany and Daniela Ryf of Switzerland. The championship was organized by the World Triathlon Corporation (WTC) and was the culmination of the Ironman 70.3 series of events that occurred from August 3, 2014 through July 12, 2015. Athletes, both professional and amateur, earned a spot in the championship race by qualifying in races throughout the 70.3 series. A prize purse of $250,000 will be distributed to the top 10 male and female professional athletes. The race marked the second year of the championship event being held in a non-recurring location and the first time being held in Europe.

Championship results

Men

Women

With Ryf's win she became the first female to win back-to-back Ironman 70.3 championship titles. Former champions Jodie Swallow and Meredith Kessler both exited the race early. Swallow pulled out after the swim after suffering a bike crash the previous day. Kessler experienced mechanical issues on the bike.

Qualification
The 2015 Ironman 70.3 Series featured 71 events that enabled qualification to the 2015 World Championship event. Professional triathletes qualified for the championship race by competing in races during the qualifying period, earning points towards their pro rankings. For the 2015 championship race that period was August 3, 2014 to July 12, 2015. An athlete’s five highest scoring races are counted toward their pro rankings. The top 50 males and top 35 females in the pro rankings qualified for the championship race. The previous five 70.3 champions receive an automatic qualifying spot provided they validate their entry by competitively finishing one qualifying race. Winners of the five regional 70.3 championships will also automatically qualify for the championship race. These winners did not count towards the final 50 and 35 qualifiers Professional athletes were also eligible for prize purses at each qualifying event, which ranged in total size from $75,000 to $100,000.

Amateur triathletes could qualify for the championship race by earning a qualifying slot at one of the qualifying events. At qualifying events, slots were allocated to each age group category, male and female, with the number of slots given out based on that category's proportional representation of the overall field. Each age group category was tentatively allocated one qualifying spot in each qualifying event. In previous years some 70.3 events also served as qualifiers for the full Ironman World Championships in Hawaii. However, the 2014 qualifying year served as the final year for almost all qualifying races in this capacity. As such this year's qualifying season only the handcycle competitions and Ironman 70.3 Kraichgau will offer qualification into the 2015 Ironman World Championship. This was to accommodate for the increased number of qualifying slots created from the newly added full Ironman events.

Non-point races
Prior to the 2014 Ironman Boulder race, World Triathlon Corporation's CEO, Andrew Messick, announced a redistribution of prize money to help facilitate paying ten professionals deep at each race as well as awarding larger prize purses at select races across Ironman and Ironman 70.3. As part of this initiative, WTC eliminated points and prize purses for professional triathletes initially at 9 Ironman events and 11 Ironman 70.3 events in 2015, mostly occurring within North America. There are nine Ironman 70.3 races with no professional points or prize purse offered for the 2015 Ironman 70.3 Championship qualifying period.

Qualifying Ironman 70.3 events

†
‡
X

Qualifying pro men
Qualifying slots into the championship race were awarded to the top 50 men in points. Slots that were not accepted by an athlete were rolled down to the next highest eligible qualifier in points.

Awarded slots are according to Ironman.com as of August 31, 2015 and final race results.

Qualifying pro women
Qualifying slots were awarded to the top 35 women in points. Slots that were not accepted by an athlete were rolled down to the next highest eligible qualifier in points.

Awarded slots are according to Ironman.com as of August 31, 2015 and final race results.

References

External links
Ironman 70.3 Series website 

Ironman World Championship
Ironman
Ironman 70.3
Triathlon competitions in Austria